Redington School District 44 is a public school district based in Pima County, Arizona.

External links
* 
 

School districts in Pima County, Arizona